Lieutenant Frederick Stanley Gordon (1897-1985) was a World War I flying ace from New Zealand. While serving in Britain's Royal Air Force, he scored nine aerial victories as a fighter pilot.

Early life
Frederick Stanley Gordon was born in New Zealand on 29 October 1897.

World War I
Gordon served in the Royal Air Force. By mid-1918, he was assigned to 74 Squadron as a fighter pilot. He began a nine victory winning streak on 2 August 1918 that was capped with his second ballon busting mission on 30 October 1918. He would be granted no military honors during the war.

List of aerial victories

Post World War I
On 3 June 1919 Gordon was awarded the Distinguished Flying Cross. On 15 July 1919 he was awarded the Belgian Croix de guerre.

Nothing more is known of him than the fact he died on 27 June 1985.

Endnotes

References
 

1897 births
1985 deaths
New Zealand World War I flying aces